The Kolb Firefly is an American open cockpit, single seat, high wing, pusher configuration, conventional landing gear-equipped ultralight aircraft that is produced in kit form by New Kolb Aircraft of London, Kentucky and intended for amateur construction. The aircraft was designed in 1995.

The Firefly is a development of the Kolb Firestar and was designed to comply with the American FAR 103 ultralight regulations, including that category's maximum  empty weight.

Design and development
The Firefly was intended to be a FAR 103 legal ultralight that was powered by the heavier  Rotax 447 engine. The  Rotax 277 engine was also an option when the aircraft was first offered.

The design features a forward fuselage of welded 4130 steel tubing, mated to an aluminum tailboom. The horizontal stabilizer, tail fin and wings are also constructed of riveted aluminum tubing with all flying surfaces covered in doped aircraft fabric. The wings are quick-folding for storage and ground transport.

The factory kit options include a complete cockpit enclosure, brakes, quick build option, Ballistic Recovery Systems parachute and steel tube powder coating.

Specifications (Firefly)

See also

References

External links

Firefly
1990s United States ultralight aircraft